Pailan College of Management and Technology, commonly known as PCMT, is a private engineering college located in Pailan, South 24 Parganas, West Bengal.

See also
List of institutions of higher education in West Bengal
Education in India
Education in West Bengal

Universities and colleges in South 24 Parganas district
Colleges affiliated to West Bengal University of Technology
2003 establishments in West Bengal
Educational institutions established in 2003